Amaryllideae are a tribe of subfamily Amaryllidoideae (family Amaryllidaceae). They are herbaceous monocot perennial flowering plants with a predominantly Southern African distribution, with the exception of the pantropical genus Crinum. They are generally treated as consisting of four subtribes. In addition to Crinum, other genera include Amaryllis, Boophone and Strumaria.

Taxonomy

Phylogeny 
The placement of Amaryllideae within subfamily Amaryllidoideae is shown in the 
following cladogram:

Subdivision 
There are four subtribes:

 Amaryllidinae Pax
 Boophoninae D.Müll.-Doblies & U.Müll.-Doblies
 Crininae Baker
 Strumariinae Traub ex D.Müll.-Doblies & U.Müll.-Doblies

These are phylogenetically related as follows:

Amaryllidinae: Type. Monogeneric subtribe for genus Amaryllis.

Boophoninae: Monogeneric subtribe for genus Boophone.

Crininae: Three genera including Crinum.

Strumariinae: Six genera including Strumaria and Nerine.

References

Bibliography

External links

Amaryllidoideae
Monocot tribes